The fifth season of Weeds premiered on June 8, 2009, on the television cable network Showtime, and consisted of 13 episodes, attracted 1.2 million viewers, with a rerun on the same night adding another 500,000 viewers for a cumulative 1.7 million. The season finale episode premiered on Monday, August 31, 2009, averaging 1.3 million viewers, up versus season 4's finale that averaged 1 million.

Plot 
Esteban spares Nancy after learning of her pregnancy. He has bodyguards assigned to her, and he forces Nancy to undergo a test to confirm the baby is his. Anxious for Shane's safety, Nancy initially has Andy send Shane to her sister, Jill Price-Grey (Jennifer Jason Leigh). However, Jill returns with Shane and Andy after Shane discovers her and Andy having sex. Silas draws up a new plan to start a legal medical marijuana business with Doug, which Nancy funds. When Nancy's initial bodyguard goes missing, Ignacio serves as her new bodyguard; Shane witnesses violence at the hands of Ignacio, who helps Shane and Isabelle steal from a teacher who stole Shane's pot.

Quinn's attempt to extort money for Celia's return to her friends and family fails miserably, since none of them are willing to pay any ransom. Returning to Ren Mar, Celia ends up squatting in Nancy's garage. Meanwhile, Andy wants Nancy to have an abortion and flee with him, suggesting that she will never be free if she has a baby with Esteban. However, Nancy ultimately decides for her and Shane to move in with Esteban.

Six months later, Esteban proposes to Nancy and she accepts, but Pilar (Kate del Castillo), a powerful woman in Mexican politics, forces Esteban to break off the engagement. Cesar arranges a birthing room in the house, so there will be no record of the baby's birth. With Andy's aid, Nancy escapes Esteban's house and appeals to her obstetrician, Dr. Audra Kitson (Alanis Morissette), who delivers the baby at the hospital; Andy later begins a relationship with Audra. To protect his political career, Esteban does not sign the birth certificate, while Nancy moves back in with Andy, who agrees to sign the certificate. He also convinces Nancy to give the baby a Bris, to Esteban's dismay.

Esteban, wanting to see his son, again asks Nancy to marry him. Simultaneously, an assassin trying to shoot Nancy misses and hits Shane in the left shoulder. When confronted by Nancy, Cesar admits to being an informant for Pilar, who ordered the hit; however, the execution was not completed because Cesar could not bring himself to perform it. Nancy keeps the betrayal from Esteban in exchange for getting to shoot Cesar in the arm. Esteban finds himself replaced as a candidate for governor, but with encouragement from Nancy, he runs as an independent.

Silas' medical marijuana shop is raided by the police, and he and Doug lose all of their pot in the process; they turn to Dean to help reclaim it. Meanwhile, Celia gets a job as a home sales representative for a cosmetics company, but unable to sell the makeup, Celia manipulates Dean into giving her the pot and begins selling it packaged with the cosmetics. Celia's story arc concludes with her forming her own team consisting of Doug, Dean, Sanjay, Ignacio, and Isabelle to sell marijuana—a deliberate echo of Nancy in season one.

The Botwin family moves into Esteban's house, and Nancy and Esteban get married. Nancy visits Guillermo in prison; she arranges for the assassination of Pilar, in exchange for Guillermo's extradition to Mexico. Esteban becomes the front-runner for governor despite Pilar's rejection, but he is arrested for suspicion of conspiracy, racketeering and tax evasion. Upon his release, Esteban again runs for governor on Pilar's platform; Pilar has arranged for his arrest, and is blackmailing him into becoming her political puppet. Pilar confronts Nancy and informs her that she and Esteban must do everything she dictates.

During a fundraising party, Pilar corners Nancy by a pool on the outside deck. Pilar reveals to Nancy that she is aware of her actions involving Guillermo, and suggests that the apparent accidental deaths of Shane and Silas would generate a sympathy vote for Esteban. Nancy threatens to kill Pilar if she endangers her children. At that moment, Pilar is whacked in the head by an unseen third party and ends up floating face down in the pool, bleeding profusely from the head. Shane appears next to Nancy, holding a croquet mallet.

Cast

Main cast 
Mary-Louise Parker as Nancy Botwin (13 episodes)
Elizabeth Perkins as Celia Hodes (13 episodes)
Hunter Parrish as Silas Botwin (13 episodes)
Alexander Gould as Shane Botwin (13 episodes)
Allie Grant as Isabelle Hodes (7 episodes)
Justin Kirk as Andy Botwin (13 episodes)
Kevin Nealon as Doug Wilson (13 episodes)

Special guest stars 
Jennifer Jason Leigh as Jill Price-Grey
Demián Bichir as Esteban Reyes
Guillermo Díaz as Guillermo García Gómez
Alanis Morissette as Dr. Audra Kitson

Departures 
This is the last season Elizabeth Perkins and Allie Grant appear in, as Celia and Isabelle Hodes respectively. Celia's whereabouts are left unknown. It is revealed in season eight that Isabelle has undergone a gender transition and is now named Bruce Hodes.

Recurring cast 

Renée Victor as Lupita
Hannah Marks as Harmony
Jillian Rose Reed as Simone
Maulik Pancholy as Sanjay Patel
Andy Milder as Dean Hodes
Haley Hudson as Quinn Hodes
Larry Joe Campbell as C.P. Jones
Amanda Pace as Shayla Grey
Rachel Pace as Taylor Grey
Hemky Madera as Ignacio Morero, Jr.
Kate del Castillo as Pilar Zuazo
Jack Stehlin as Captain Roy Till
Mel Fair as Scott
Ramón Franco as Sucio
Anthony Ledesma as Bodyguard
Kevin Alejandro as Rudolpho
Jamie Denbo as Raylene
Matt Peters as Gayle
Todd Robert Anderson as Mr. Sundasky
Seychelle Gabriel as Adelita
Stephanie Erb as Margaret
Jonathan Blitt as Blitt
Carlos Gómez as Dr. Brisas
Helen Sun as Boba Employee
Olivia Summers as Orange Julia

Episodes

See also 
The General Lee
Ms. Pac-Man
Politicians killed in the Mexican Drug War

References

External links 
 
 

 
2009 American television seasons